The Silesian Voivodeship Sejmik is the regional legislature of the Voivodeship of Silesia in Poland. It is a unicameral parliamentary body consisting of forty-five councillors elected for a five-year term. The current chairperson of the assembly is Marek Gzik of PO.

The assembly elects the executive board that acts as the collective executive for the regional government, headed by the voivodeship marshal. After the 2018 election, the Executive Board of Silesia was formed by Law and Justice and Wojciech Kałuża, independent councilor elected from the KO. But on November 21, 2022, four PiS councillors, including the incumbent Marshal, left the party and joined the opposition, giving them a majority. The board's current chief executive is Marshal Jakub Chełstowski of local movement "Tak! dla Polski" (until 21 November 2022 he was a member of PiS).

The Silesian Assembly convenes within the Silesian Parliament building in Katowice.

Districts 
Members of the assembly are elected from seven districts, serve five-year terms. Districts does not have the constituencies formal names. Instead, each constituency has a number and territorial description.

Composition

1998

2002

2006

2010

2014

2018

See also 
 Polish Regional Assembly
 Silesian Voivodeship

Notes

References

External links
Official website
Executive board official website

Silesian
Assembly
Unicameral legislatures